The National Business Education Accreditation Council (NBEAC) is an accreditation body under the administrative control of Higher Education Commission (Pakistan). NBEAC accredits Business Administration, Public Administration and Management Sciences degree programs of Pakistan's educational institutes.

NBEAC function at the national level as an accreditation authority within its scope to facilitate enhancing the quality of business education in Pakistan. Since its inception, it has laid out systems, procedures, networks and programs to ensure that all degree awarding institutions in Pakistan are invited to achieve standards that are comparable with global standards and thus gain NBEAC accreditation. In future this accreditation could be used as a mechanism to introduce business school rankings to encourage competitiveness, quality, continuous improvement and sustainability in the Pakistan business education market.

NBEAC accreditation acts both as a status and a process. Accreditation as status provides public notification that the accredited program meets standards of quality set forth by the NBEAC. As a process, accreditation reflects the fact that in achieving recognition by NBEAC, the institution and the program is committed to not only to meet standards but to continuously seek ways in which to enhance the quality of education in that program. Programmatic accreditation is an independent peer review process that validates that established standards of excellence set by the NBEAC are well met. NBEAC has designed these standards to assure that the graduates receive the quality of education in that program necessary for success in industry.

See also 
List of business schools in Pakistan

References

External links 
NBEAC official website

Educational organisations based in Pakistan
Higher Education Commission (Pakistan)
Business schools in Pakistan